The 2015 Connecticut Open was a women's tennis tournament played on outdoor hard courts. It was the 47th edition of the Connecticut Open, and part of the Premier Series of the 2015 WTA Tour. It took place at the Cullman-Heyman Tennis Center in New Haven, Connecticut, United States, from August 23 through August 29. It was the last event of the 2015 US Open Series before the 2015 US Open.

Points and prize money

Point distribution

Prize money

Singles main-draw entrants

Seeds

 Rankings are as of August 17, 2015

Other entrants
The following players received wildcards into the singles main draw:
  Agnieszka Radwańska
  Alison Riske
  Lucie Šafářová
  Caroline Wozniacki

The following player received entry using a protected ranking:
  Dominika Cibulková

The following players received entry from the qualifying draw:
  Olga Govortsova
  Polona Hercog
  Yulia Putintseva
  Magdaléna Rybáriková
  Olga Savchuk
  Roberta Vinci

The following player received entry as a lucky loser:
  Lesia Tsurenko

Withdrawals
Before the tournament
  Belinda Bencic → replaced by  Daria Gavrilova
  Simona Halep (Left thigh injury) → replaced by  Lesia Tsurenko
  Ekaterina Makarova → replaced by  Barbora Strýcová
  Sloane Stephens → replaced by  Tsvetana Pironkova

Retirements
  Olga Govortsova
  Elina Svitolina

Doubles main-draw entrants

Seeds

Rankings are as of August 17, 2015

Other entrants
The following pair received a wildcard into the doubles main draw:
  Lauren Davis /  Alison Riske

Finals

Singles

  Petra Kvitová defeated  Lucie Šafářová, 6–7(6–8), 6–2, 6–2

Doubles

  Julia Görges /  Lucie Hradecká defeated  Chuang Chia-jung /  Liang Chen, 6–3, 6–1

References

External links

 
Connecticut Open by year
2015 WTA Tour
2015 US Open Series